The Nokia N85 is a smartphone produced by Nokia, announced on 27 August 2008 as part of the Nseries line. The N85 runs on Symbian OS v9.3 with S60 3rd Edition platform with Feature Pack 2. It was released in October, retailing for 450 euros before taxes.

The major feature N85 introduced was an AMOLED display, giving brighter and sharper colours. The N85 has a dual-slider like the Nokia N95 to access either media playback buttons or a numeric keypad, and is about 25% slimmer in size. The upper sliding keys illuminate between four multimedia keys in music or video playback, and two gaming keys during the playing of N-Gage 2.0 games. It also has a Navi wheel like the Nokia N81 which it replaced and bases its design from, as well as a GPS receiver, 5-megapixel camera with dual LED flash, and an FM transmitter.

The N85 was well received as a decent upgrade to the N95, as well as better than the actual flagship, Nokia N96, which cost 100 euros more with few additions and was somewhat critically negative. Compared to the N96, the N85 is thinner and lighter, has a camera lens cover, has a larger battery capacity, USB charging (via the microUSB port), and an AMOLED screen; although without large internal memory or a DVB-H receiver.

Specifications

Dimensions
 Form: Two-way slider
 Volume: 76 cc
 Weight: 128 g
 Dimensions: 103 × 50 × 16.0 mm

Two-way slider with spring assistance mechanism

Memory
 microSD memory card slot, hot swappable, max. 8 GB (After firmware update)
 128 MB internal dynamic memory
 78 MB internal NAND flash memory

Data network
 HSDPA, maximum speed 3.6 Mbit/s (DL)
 WCDMA 900/1900/2100, maximum speed PS 384/384 kbit/s (UL/DL)
 EDGE class B, multislot class 32, maximum speed 296/177.6 kbit/s (DL/UL)
 GPRS class A, multislot class 32, maximum speed 107/64.2 kbit/s (DL/UL)
 HSCSD, maximum speed 43.2 kbit/s
 CSD
 WLAN 802.11b, 802.11g
WLAN Security: WPA2-Enterprise, WPA2-Personal, WPA-Enterprise, WPA-Personal, WEP
WLAN Quality of Service: WMM, U-APSD
WLAN wizard
 TCP/IP support
 Capability to serve as data modem

Display and user interface
 Size: 2.6"
 Resolution: 320 × 240 pixels (QVGA)
 Up to 16.7 million colours
 Active Matrix OLED technology

Power management

 BL-5K 1200 mAh Li-Ion battery
 Talk time (maximum):
 GSM 6.9 h
 WCDMA 4.5 h
 VoIP 6 h
 Standby time (maximum):
 GSM 363 h
 WCDMA 363 h
 WLAN 172 h
 Browsing time with packet data (maximum): 5 h 42 min
 Video playback time (maximum): 7 h
 Video recording time (maximum): 2 h 54 min
 Video call time (maximum): 2 h 42 min
 Gaming time (maximum): 7 h

Operating frequency
 Quad-band EGSM 850/900/1800/1900
 WCDMA 2100/1900/850 (in the Americas) and 2100/1900/900 (everywhere else)
 Automatic switching between WCDMA/GSM bands
 Flight mode

Connectivity
 Bluetooth version 2.0 with Enhanced Data Rate.
 Bluetooth profiles:
 Dial Up Networking Profile (Gateway)
 Object Push Profile (Server and Client)
 File Transfer Profile (Server)
 Hands Free Profile (Audio Gateway)
 Headset Profile (Audio Gateway)
 Basic Imaging Profile (Image Push Responder and Initiator)
 Remote SIM Access Profile (Server)
 Device Identification Profile
 Phone Book Access Profile (Server)
 Stereo Audio Streaming:
 Generic Audio/Video Distribution Profile
 Audio/Video Remote Control Profile (A/V Remote Control Target)
 Advanced Audio Distribution Profile (Audio Source)
 Add-ons enable integration into enterprise private branch exchange (PBX) infrastructure
 DLNA (Digital Living Network Alliance) certification
 UPnP support
 MTP (Mobile Transfer Protocol) support
 TV out (PAL) with Nokia Video Connectivity Cable (CA-75U, in box inclusion may vary based on sales package configuration)
 Nokia XpressPrint
 Support for local and remote SyncML synchronization

Digital TV 
With optional DVB-H Nokia Mobile TV Receiver SU-33W it is possible to watch television on the screen of the phone.

References

External links 

Nokia Nseries
Slider phones
Mobile phones introduced in 2008